Mýtna is a village and municipality in the Lučenec District in the Banská Bystrica Region of Slovakia.

Mýtna was already settled in the prehistorical era - some scientists supposed that people already lived here in the younger Bronze Age probably 3,000 years ago. In the 7th century came Avars and then Slavs. The first mention of that village comes from 14th century (1393) called 'Wamuslehutaya' it means toll (duty) village. In 1467 'Wamosfalva' and in 1773 had nearly the present name but with i 'Mitna'. That name likely comes from 1423 when there was just several houses, and the toll house which served to pay a toll (duty) because of using the way from Zvolen to Lučenec. 2 km away lies the Castle of Divin which took the toll. In 1467 Mýtna already belonged under the Castle. Gradual settlement in the Valley of Kriváň creek came from the north and northwest and was completed settlement in the surrounding mountains in the 19th and 20th century. The village at present introduces an entrance gateway for traveling in the northwest region of Novohrad. It already has all offer of shops and services not only for own residents but also for a visitors.

External links
 
 
 Urban and Municipal Statistics SR

Villages and municipalities in Lučenec District